Élisabeth Rappeneau (19 January 1940 – 2 January 2020) was a French film director and screenwriter.

Personal life
She was the sister of the French director Jean-Paul Rappeneau and the aunt of musician Martin Rappeneau and of screenwriter Julien Rappeneau.

Filmography

References

External links

1940 births
2020 deaths
French film directors
French women film directors
French women screenwriters
French screenwriters
Place of birth missing